"May the Force Be with You Always" is a song written and recorded by American country music artist Tom T. Hall. It was released in November 1977 as the lead single from the album, New Train Same Rider. The song peaked at number 13 on the U.S. country singles chart and at number 5 on the Canadian country singles chart.

Chart performance

References 
 

1977 singles
Tom T. Hall songs
Songs written by Tom T. Hall
1977 songs
RCA Records singles